is a former Japanese football player. She played for Japan national team.

Club career
Oita was born on August 3, 1969. She played for Kobe FC, Nikko Securities Dream Ladies, Shiroki FC Serena and Takarazuka Bunnys.

National team career
On January 21, 1986, when Oita was 16 years old, she debuted for Japan national team against India. She played 3 games for Japan until 1987.

National team statistics

References

1969 births
Living people
Japanese women's footballers
Japan women's international footballers
Tasaki Perule FC players
Nikko Securities Dream Ladies players
Shiroki FC Serena players
Bunnys Kyoto SC players
Women's association footballers not categorized by position